The Port Said Cultural Entertainment Center, also known as the Port Said Opera House, is an opera house, theatre, and cinema in Port Said, Egypt. It opened in December 2016 and was inaugurated by Egyptian president Abdel Fattah el-Sisi. The main theatre, named for the Egyptian actor Mahmoud Yassin, has a capacity of 1,200 people. It also contains two movie theatres, meeting and conference rooms, a cafeteria, and a library.

Ground was broken on the four-story complex in 2006. The building's construction was a part of an initiative by the Ministry of Culture to bring cultural centers and buildings of the arts to Egyptian cities.

References

Opera houses in Egypt